Juan de Ponte (ca. 1828 – ca. 1908) was interim Mayor of Ponce, Puerto Rico, from 5 January 1888 to 4 April 1888.

Background
De Ponte had been harbormaster at the Port of Ponce and was one of a group of citizens who labored extensively to bring a water pipeline from the Acueducto de Ponce in the city proper to serve the needs for potable water at Barrio Playa. He was recruited to serve as mayor from his work as a harbourmaster at the Port of Ponce.

Mayoral term
His mayoral tenure was from 5 January to 4 April 1988—a short 90 days. He was named provisional mayor of Ponce until a permanent mayor could be appointed. Nothing significant occurred during his 3-month stay as mayor.  Upon De Ponte presenting his resignation, the Municipal Council presented three names for his replacement: Juan Seix, Luis Gautier, and Santiago Oppenheimer.

See also

 List of Puerto Ricans
 List of mayors of Ponce, Puerto Rico

Notes

References

Further reading
 Ramon Marin. Las Fiestas Populares de Ponce. Editorial Universidad de Puerto Rico. 1994.
 Fay Fowlie de Flores. Ponce, Perla del Sur: Una Bibliografía Anotada. Second Edition. 1997. Ponce, Puerto Rico: Universidad de Puerto Rico en Ponce. p. 334. Item 1666. 
 Ponce. ''Ordenanzas de policía urbana urbana y rural para la ciudad de Ponce y su termino municipal; aprobadas por el Excmo. Sr. Gobernador General en 24 de febrero de 1888. 2. ed. Ponce, Puerto Rico: Imprenta de Manuel Lopez, 1904. (Universidad de Puerto Rico, Rio Piedras)

External links
 Guardia Civil española (c. 1898) (Includes military ranks in 1880s Spanish Empire.)

Mayors of Ponce, Puerto Rico
1820s births
1900s deaths
Year of death uncertain
Year of birth uncertain